is a passenger railway station located in the town of  Chizu, Yazu District, Tottori, Japan. It is operated by the third-sector semi-public railway operator Chizu Express.

Lines

Station layout
The station consists of one side platform serving a single bi-directional track. The platform is located on in a cutting and is reached by stairs. The station is unattended.

Adjacent stations

History
Yamasato Station opened on December 3, 1994 with the opening of the Chizu Line.

Passenger statistics
In fiscal 2018, the station was used by an average of 14 passengers daily.

Surrounding area
 Former Chizu Town Yamago Elementary School
 Tottori Expressway Chizu South Interchange

See also
 List of railway stations in Japan

References

External links

Yamasato Station official home page

Railway stations in Tottori Prefecture
Railway stations in Japan opened in 1994
Chizu, Tottori